Ahmed Abdel-Ghani (born 1 December 1981) was an Egyptian professional footballer.

External links

1981 births
Living people
Egyptian footballers
Egypt international footballers
2009 FIFA Confederations Cup players
People from Minya Governorate
Haras El Hodoud SC players
Association football forwards
Misr Lel Makkasa SC players
Egyptian expatriate footballers
Expatriate footballers in Oman
Egyptian expatriate sportspeople in Oman
Sur SC players
Oman Professional League players
El Minya SC players
Egyptian Premier League players